Francis Lord Charlton Hodson, Baron Hodson,  (17 September 1895 – 11 March 1984), also known as Charles Hodson, was a British judge who served as Lord of Appeal in Ordinary from 1960 to 1971.

Biography
Charles, as he was always known, was the son of Rev. Thomas Hodson, rector of Oddington, Gloucestershire, and Catherine Anne (née Maskew), he was born in Cheltenham, Gloucestershire, and educated at Cheltenham College and Wadham College, Oxford.

His university studies were interrupted by the First World War, during which he served with the 7th Battalion, Gloucestershire Regiment in Gallipoli and Mesopotamia, being wounded several times. He received the Military Cross for his action during the Siege of Kut with the following citation:

For conspicuous gallantry and devotion to duty. He led his company most gallantly against a strong enemy redoubt, being twice wounded, and refused to be brought in till the wounded round him had been evacuated.

After the war, Hodson finished his studies and was called to the Bar by the Inner Temple in 1921. He initially practiced at the common law bar, but switched to the divorce bar, then thought of as a dead end because of financial reasons. At the time, judges of the Probate, Divorce and Admiralty Division were inevitable drawn from the admiralty bar. However, in 1937, the impending passage of the Matrimonial Causes Bill and the projected rise in the number of divorce cases made the appointment of a divorce specialist to the bench inevitable. As a consequence, that year, he was made a King's Counsel at the Lord Chancellor's invitation, was appointed to the High Court shortly after, and received the customary knighthood. Aged 42, he was the youngest High Court judge ever appointed.

He was Lord Justice of Appeal from 1951 to 1960, and was sworn in the Privy Council in 1951. On 1 October 1960, he was appointed Lord of Appeal in Ordinary and was created a life peer with the title Baron Hodson, of Rotherfield Greys in the County of Oxford.

He retired as Lord of Appeal in 1971. Hodson was a member of the International Court of Arbitration at The Hague between 1949 and 1971 and further president of the British branch of the International Law Association.

Of his legacy, Lord Devlin wrote that "Hodson's thirty-four years of judicial service left little or no mark on the law. He took the law as he found it, whether he liked it or not."

Selected judgments
In Shaw v DPP, (1961) UKHL 1 rendered on 4 May 1961, Lord Hodson said,

Personal life
In 1918, Hodson married Susan Mary Blake, daughter of Major William Greaves Blake. Susan had been his nurse during the war. They had three children. Their daughter, the Hon. Anthea Joseph, became a prominent publisher. Their elder son, Lt. Hubert Blake Hodson, was killed in action in Libya on 22 January 1941 while serving with the 9th Queen's Royal Lancers. The younger son, Hon. Charles Christopher Philip Hodson, married Rose Markham, daughter of Sir Charles Markham, 2nd Baronet, in 1953.

Lady Hodson died in 1965. Lord Hodson died in 1984 at a nursing home in Goring-on-Thames.

References

1895 births
1984 deaths
People from Cheltenham
People educated at Cheltenham College
Gloucestershire Regiment officers
British Army personnel of World War I
Law lords
Members of the Privy Council of the United Kingdom
Recipients of the Military Cross
Members of the Judicial Committee of the Privy Council
Knights Bachelor
Probate, Divorce and Admiralty Division judges
Alumni of Wadham College, Oxford
Lords Justices of Appeal